is the third full-length album by Japanese novelty heavy metal band Animetal, released through Sony Records on October 21, 1998. The album consists of a non-stop marathon of metal covers of theme songs of shows produced by Tsuburaya Productions and Eiji Tsuburaya, primarily the Ultra Series.

Track listing 
All tracks are arranged by Animetal.

Personnel
 - Lead vocals
 - Guitar
Masaki - Bass

with

Katsuji - Drums

Footnotes

References

External links 

1998 albums
Animetal albums
Japanese-language albums
Sony Music Entertainment Japan albums
Ultra Series